Sarbanlar may refer to:
 Sarbanlar, Ardabil (ساربانلار - Sārbānlār)
 Sarbanlar, Hamadan (ساربانلر - Sārbānlar)